Darren Alexander McNees (born 14 June 1979) is an Australian cricketer who played for Tasmania.

A tall fast bowler, Darren McNees toured India with the Australian Cricket Academy, but could not break into his home state's line-up. He joined the long list of the Tigers' imported fast bowlers as Tasmania kept seeking to find bowlers to back up their home grown batting talent. He impressed on his domestic one day debut, taking 2 for 28, but failed to hold down a regular spot in the side.

External links 

1979 births
Living people
Australian cricketers
Tasmania cricketers
Cricketers from Victoria (Australia)